The first government of Werner Faymann was sworn in on December 2, 2008. Following the resignation of Vice Chancellor and ÖVP party chairman Josef Pröll from all political functions, a cabinet reshuffle took place. The new government members were sworn in by the President of Austria on 21 April 2011.  The first Faymann government was succeeded by the Second Faymann government on December 16, 2013.

Notes

External links 
 Federal Chancellery of Austria: Government

Politics of Austria
2008 establishments in Austria
Faymann I
2000s in Austria
2013 disestablishments in Austria